Most American television episodes with LGBTQ+ themes that aired before the 1969 Stonewall riots were on various local talk shows. Generally, these shows would gravely discuss the "problem" of homosexuality with a panel of "experts" on the subject, none of whom were identified as homosexual. These included such programs as Confidential File out of Los Angeles, which produced "Homosexuals and the Problems They Present" in 1954 and "Homosexuals Who Stalk and Molest Our Children" in 1955, and  The Open Mind out of New York which aired "Introduction to the Problem of Homosexuality", "Homosexuality: A Psychological Approach" and "Male and Female in American Society" during its 1956–1957 season. One notable exception to this rule was Showcase, hosted out of New York by author Fannie Hurst beginning in 1958. Showcase presented several of the earliest well-rounded discussions of homosexuality and was one of the few programs on which homosexual men spoke for themselves rather than being debated by a panel of "experts". Hurst was praised by early homophile group the Mattachine Society, which invited Hurst to deliver the keynote address at the Society's 1958 convention.

A brief break from this pattern came in 1961 with the production of The Rejected, the first documentary program on homosexuality aired on American television. The Rejected presented information on such topics as the Kinsey Reports and featured anthropologist Margaret Mead discussing homosexuality in ancient Greece and among Native American cultures. A representative from the Mattachine Society also appeared on-air. However, the old model quickly re-emerged with such broadcasts as "Society and the Homosexual" in 1962 from the Los Angeles-based Argument and Chicago's Off the Cuff, which in 1963 presented a discussion of lesbianism with an all-male panel. CBS became the first national network to broadcast a documentary hour, in 1967. CBS Reports: The Homosexuals featured men interviewed in shadow and from behind potted plants to conceal their identities and anti-gay psychologists Charles W. Socarides and Irving Bieber in a broadcast that has been described as  "the single most destructive hour of antigay propaganda in our nation's history".

During the 1960s, a few fiction series broached the subject obliquely, with "coded" or repressed lesbians like Miss Brant from 1961's The Asphalt Jungle or discussion of characters who may or may not have been gay like Channing's Buddy Crown in 1963. Those episodes that featured identified lesbian or gay characters tended to present them as either victims or killers. Following the 1969 Stonewall riots, a seminal event in the American gay rights movement, gay activist groups began speaking out more forcefully, challenging how homosexuality was portrayed on-screen.

Episodes

See also
 List of 1970s American television episodes with LGBT themes
 List of 1980s American television episodes with LGBT themes
 List of 1990s American television episodes with LGBT themes
 List of made-for-television films with LGBT characters
 Lists of television programs with LGBT characters

Notes

References

Episodes with LGBT themes, Pre-Stonewall riots
Episodes with LGBT themes, Pre-Stonewall riots
American television episodes with LGBT themes, Pre-Stonewall riots
Television episodes, Pre-Stonewall riots
LGBT themes, Pre-Stonewall riots
American television episodes, Pre-Stonewall riots
1950s LGBT-related mass media
1960s LGBT-related mass media
LGBT themes in fiction